Stolper See is a lake in Kreis Plön, Schleswig-Holstein, Germany, to the east of the eponymous village of Stolpe.
The lake covers an area of 133.4 hectares, a maximum depth of 14.97 metres, and is 27 metres above sea level.

References

Lakes of Schleswig-Holstein